Scotland competes at the Olympic Games as part of the United Kingdom. This article provides a list of medallists for Great Britain at every Summer and Winter Olympics who are Scottish, as well as teams where at least one member was Scottish.

List of Summer Olympic medallists

1896 Athens 
Launceston Elliot, Gold, Weightlifting, One-Handed
Launceston Elliot, Silver, Weightlifting, Two-Handed

1900 Paris 
Walter Rutherford, Silver, Golf
David Robertson, Bronze, Golf

1908 London 
Arthur Robertson, Gold, Team steeplechase
Wyndham Halswelle, Gold, 400 m
Angus Gillan, Gold, Coxless fours
George Cornet, Gold, Water polo
Royal Clyde Yacht Club, Gold, 12 metres class
Arthur Robertson, Silver, Steeplechase
Alex McCulloch, Silver, Single sculls
Hugh Roddin, Bronze, Featherweight boxing
Scotland, Bronze, Hockey

1912 Stockholm 
Philip Fleming, Gold, Rowing eights
Angus Gillan, Gold, Rowing eights
Wally Kinnear, Gold, Single sculls
Henry Macintosh, Gold, Men's 4 × 100 m Relay
Robert Murray, Gold, Small bore shooting
George Cornet, Gold, Water polo
Isabella Moore, Gold, 100 m freestyle swimming
James Soutter, Bronze, 400 m relay
John Sewell, Silver, Tug of war team

1920 Antwerp 
Robert Lindsay, Gold, 400 m relay
John Sewell, Gold, Tug of war team
William Peacock, Gold, Water polo
James Wilson, Silver, Cross country team
Alexander Ireland, Silver, Welterweight boxing
James Wilson, Bronze, 10,000 m
George McKenzie, Bronze, Bantamweight boxing
William Cuthbertson, Bronze, Flyweight boxing

1924 Paris 
Eric Liddell, Gold, 400 m
Eric Liddell, Bronze, 200 m
James McNabb, Gold, Coxless fours
James McKenzie, Silver, Lightweight boxing
Archie Macdonald, Bronze, 100 kg freestyle wrestling

1928 Amsterdam 
Ellen King, Silver, 100 m backstroke swimming 
Ellen King, Silver, 100 m freestyle relay swimming 
Sarah Stewart, Silver, 100 m freestyle relay swimming

1948 London 
Alistair McCorquodale, Silver, 4 × 100 m relay 
David Brodie, Silver, Hockey team 
Robin Lindsay, Silver, Hockey team 
William Lindsay, Silver, Hockey team 
George Sime, Silver, Hockey team 
Neil White, Silver, Hockey team 
Catherine Gibson, Bronze, 400 m freestyle swimming

1952 Helsinki 
Douglas Stewart, Gold, Equestrian showjumping team 
Stephen Theobald, Bronze, Hockey team 
Helen Gordon, Bronze, 200 m breaststroke swimming

1956 Melbourne 
Dick McTaggart, Gold, Boxing, Lightweight
John McCormack, Bronze, Boxing, Light Middleweight

1960 Rome 
Dick McTaggart, Bronze, Lightweight boxing

1964 Tokyo 
Bobby McGregor, Silver, Swimming, 100 m Freestyle

1968 Mexico 
Rodney Pattisson, Gold, Yachting Flying Dutchman

1972 Munich 
Rodney Pattisson, Gold, Yachting Flying Dutchman 
David Jenkins, Silver, 400 m relay team 
David Wilkie, Silver, 200 m breaststroke swimming 
Ian Stewart, Bronze, 5,000 m

1976 Montreal 
David Wilkie, Gold, 200 m breaststroke swimming 
David Wilkie, Silver, 100 m breaststroke swimming 
Rodney Pattisson, Silver, Yachting Flying Dutchman 
Alan McClatchey, Bronze, 200 m freestyle swimming relay 
Gordon Downie, Bronze, 200 m freestyle swimming relay
Hugh Matheson, Silver, Men's Rowing Eights
David Maxwell, Silver, Men's Rowing Eights

1980 Moscow

1984 Los Angeles

1988 Seoul

1992 Barcelona

1996 Atlanta

2000 Sydney

2004 Athens

2008 Beijing

2012 London

2016 Rio

2020 Tokyo

List of Winter Olympic medallists

1924 Chamonix
Royal Caledonian Curling Club, Gold, Curling

1936 Garmisch-Partenkirchen
James Foster, Gold, ice hockey

2002 Salt Lake City
Rhona Martin (skipper), Gold, Curling
Deborah Knox, Gold, Curling
Fiona MacDonald, Gold, Curling
Janice Rankin, Gold, Curling
Margaret Morton, Gold, Curling

2014 Sochi
David Murdoch (skipper), Silver, Men's Curling
Greg Drummond, Silver, Men's Curling
Scott Andrews, Silver, Men's Curling
Michael Goodfellow, Silver, Men's Curling
Tom Brewster, Silver, Men's Curling
Eve Muirhead (skipper), Bronze, Woman's Curling
Anna Sloan, Bronze, Woman's Curling
Vicki Adams, Bronze, Woman's Curling
Claire Hamilton, Bronze, Woman's Curling
Lauren Gray, Bronze, Woman's Curling
Stuart Benson, Bronze, Men's 4-Man Bobsleigh

See also 
Great Britain at the Olympics
Sport in Scotland
Campaign for a Scottish Olympic Team

Notes

References 

 
 
Scotland sport-related lists
Lists of Olympic competitors for Great Britain
Okympics